Luigi Batzella (San Sperate, 1924 – San Sperate, 2008) also known as Paolo Solvay was an Italian film director, editor, screenwriter and actor. He made numerous low-budget genre films.

Life and career 
Luigi Batzella was born in San Sperate, Sardinia in 1924. After what film historian and critic Roberto Curti described as "a nondescript career as an actor," Batzella began his career as a director in 1966 with the war film Tre franchi die pietà. After directing a few low budget westerns, Batzella directed his first horror film The Devil's Wedding Night which was directed with an uncredited Joe D'Amato. Following the release of his next horror film Nude for Satan in 1978, Batzella directed two Nazisploitation films Kaput Lager – Gli ultimi giorni delle SS and La Bestia in calore for which he was credited as Ivan Kathansky. His next feature would be the sex comedy Probito erotico starring Ajita Wilson where he is credited as Paul Selvin. His final official film credit was for the film Strategia per una missione di morte where he is credited as Kathansky in some prints and as A.M. Frank in the French version. Curti has stated that some sources claim Batzella was involved with the Bruce Le production Mie ju que que. Batzella died in San Sperate in 2008 at the age of 84.

Partial filmography

Footnotes

References

External links
 

Italian film directors
20th-century Italian screenwriters
People from the Province of Cagliari
1924 births
2008 deaths
Horror film directors
Spaghetti Western directors
Italian male screenwriters
20th-century Italian male writers